Marja Wokke (born 21 March 1957 in Bergen, North Holland) is a former marathon runner from the Netherlands, most active in the 1970s and 1980s.

Biography
Wokke won the inaugural Rotterdam Marathon on 23 May 1981, clocking in at 2:43:23. In 1980 she was ranked fifth in the world with her best ever performance (2:32:28), which she ran in Eugene, Oregon.

Wokke won the City-Pier-City Loop half marathon in the Hague in 1980, when the race had women category for the first time. At this occasion she set a new world record time of 1:13:59.

Achievements

References

External links

1957 births
Living people
Dutch female long-distance runners
Dutch female marathon runners
People from Bergen, North Holland
Sportspeople from North Holland
20th-century Dutch women
21st-century Dutch women